Bekennen will ich seinen Namen (I shall acknowledge His name), BWV 200, is an arrangement by Johann Sebastian Bach of an aria from Gottfried Heinrich Stölzel's passion-oratorio Die leidende und am Kreuz sterbende Liebe. He scored it for alto, two violins and continuo, possibly as part of a cantata for the feast of Purification. He probably led the first performance around 1742.

History and text 
Bach arranged in Bekennen will ich seinen Namen an aria, "Dein Kreuz, o Bräutgam meiner Seelen" (Your cross, o bridegroom of my soul" from Gottfried Heinrich Stölzel's passion-oratorio Die leidende und am Kreuz sterbende Liebe. Bach's arrangement, dated around 1742–1743, was possibly part of a cantata for the Marian feast of Purification.

Bach likely performed his arrangement in 1742 in Leipzig.

Music 
The aria is scored for solo alto voice, two violins, and basso continuo. As with many of Bach's latest cantatas, the aria has a "quality of mellow assurance". It is in adapted ternary form but includes no clear reprise of the opening section. The vocal line includes melismas but no other word painting.

Recordings 
Academy of St Martin-in-the-Fields, Kenneth Sillito. J.S. Bach: Cantatas Nos. 53 · 82 · 170 · 200. Capriccio, 1993.
Amsterdam Baroque Orchestra, Ton Koopman. J.S. Bach: Complete Cantatas Vol. 21. Antoine Marchand, 2002.
Bach-Orchester Mainz, Diethard Hellmann. J.S. Bach: Psalm 51 BWV 1083 & Cantata BWV 200. Da Camera, 1966.
English Baroque Soloists, John Eliot Gardiner. J.S. Bach: Cantatas for the Feast of Purification of Mary. Archiv Produktkion, 2000.
Netherlands Bach Collegium, Pieter Jan Leusink. Bach Edition Vol. 17. Brilliant Classics, 2000.
Philomusica of London, Thurston Dart. J.S. Bach: Cantatas BWV 53, BWV 54, BWV 200, BWV 244. L'Oiseau-Lyre, 1958.
Musica Antiqua Köln, Reinhard Goebel. BWV 200: Aria for contralto, 2 violins and basso continuo Magdalena Kozena Archiv Production 2003

References

Sources

External links 
 
 Bach Cantata Translations / BWV 200 - "Bekennen will ich seinen Namen" Emmanuel Music 2020

Church cantatas by Johann Sebastian Bach
1720 compositions
1742 compositions